Drepanosiphinae is a subfamily of aphids in the family Aphididae. There are about 13 genera, 8 of which are extinct, and more than 60 described species in Drepanosiphinae.

While a few authors have suggested treating the group as a family, this has not been adopted in the most recent classifications.

Genera
These 13 genera belong to the subfamily Drepanosiphinae:
 Drepanaphis Del Guercio, 1909
 Drepanosiphoniella Davatchi, Hille Ris Lambers & Remaudière, 1957
 Drepanosiphum Koch, 1855
 Shenahweum Hottes & Frison, 1931
 Yamatocallis Matsumura, 1917
 † Aphidopsis Scudder, 1890
 † Electrocallis Heie, 1967
 † Fossilicallis Heie, 2002
 † Hongocallis Wegierek, 2010
 † Megantennaphis Heie, 1967
 † Similidrepan Heie, 2006
 † Siphonophoroides Buckton, 1883
 † Zymus Heie, 1972

References

Aphididae
Hemiptera subfamilies